Paul Robineau was a French rower. He competed in the men's double sculls event at the 1928 Summer Olympics.

References

External links

Year of birth missing
Year of death missing
French male rowers
Olympic rowers of France
Rowers at the 1928 Summer Olympics
Place of birth missing